1. Fußball-Club Kaiserslautern e. V., also known as 1. FCK, FCK, FC Kaiserslautern or colloquially Lautern, is a German sports club based in Kaiserslautern, Rhineland-Palatinate. In addition to football, the club also operates in several other sports.

On 2 June 1900, Germania 1896 and FG Kaiserslautern merged to create FC 1900. In 1909, the club went on to join FC Palatia (founded in 1901) and FC Bavaria (founded in 1902) to form FV 1900 Kaiserslautern. In 1929, they merged with SV Phönix to become FV Phönix-Kaiserslautern before finally taking on their current name in 1933.

As a founding member of the Bundesliga, FCK played from 1963 to 1996 uninterrupted in the top division. It has won four German championships, two DFB-Pokals, and one DFL-Supercup, and historically is among the most successful football clubs in Germany, currently occupying eleventh place in the all-time Bundesliga table. The club's international performances include reaching the Champions League quarter-finals in 1999 as well as two participations in the UEFA Cup semi-finals. Their first league title in the Bundesliga era was won in 1991. Kaiserslautern then won the German championship in the 1997–98 season as a newly promoted team, which is unique in German football. After a six-year spell in the second tier, in 2018 they were relegated to the 3. Liga for the first time. In 2022, Kaiserslautern was promoted again to the 2. Bundesliga  because they won the promotion playoff.

Since 1920, Kaiserslautern's stadium has been the Fritz-Walter-Stadion, named in 1985 after Fritz Walter, the captain of the West German national team who won the World Cup in 1954. Walter spent his entire career at Kaiserslautern.

History

Early years through World War II
Two of the club's predecessors, Bavaria and FC 1900 Kaiserslautern, were part of the Westkreis-Liga (I) when this league was formed in 1908, with the latter winning the first league. From 1909 through 1918, the new FV Kaiserslautern performed well, finishing runners-up in 1910 and 1912. The team reached tier-one in the new Kreisliga Saar in 1919, the Kreisliga Pfalz in 1920 and the Bezirksliga Rhein-Saar in 1931 and spent the rest of the 1930s bouncing up and down between the Bezirksliga and the upper level Gauliga Südwest, one of sixteen top flight divisions formed in the re-organization of German football under Nazi Germany.

The club's performance was unremarkable in the years leading up to World War II, but improved after 1939. They captured the Gauliga Südwest/Staffel Saarpfalz title, but lost the overall division title to Staffel Mainhessen winners Kickers Offenbach. In the 1941–42 season the Gauliga Südwest was split into the Gauliga Hessen-Nassau and the Gauliga Westmark, and Kaiserslautern took the Westmark title, going on to play for the first time in the national final rounds. They were decisively put out 3–9 by eventual champions Schalke 04, the dominant side in this era of German football.

The performance of the team slipped and they finished last in their division in 1944. The following year saw the collapse of league play as Nazi Germany crumbled under the advance of Allied armies.

Postwar play

After the war, southwestern Germany was part of the occupation zone held by the French. Teams there were organized into northern and southern divisions and played to determine which of them would join the new Oberliga being put together. French authorities were slow to loosen their control over play in their zones of occupation – and in the Saarland in particular – Teams in the French areas took longer to join the re-established German national league than in other parts of the country. 1. FC Kaiserslautern resumed play in the Oberliga Südwest in 1945 and finished the season just one point behind 1. FC Saarbrücken. The next season, they easily won the Gruppe Nord in 1947 due in large part due to the play of Fritz Walter and his brother Ottmar – the duo scored 46 goals between them, more than any other entire team.

Success in the 1950s and entry to the Bundesliga
This marked the beginning of the club's dominance of the Oberliga Südwest as they went on to capture the division title eleven times over the next twelve seasons. FCK advanced to Germany's first post-war national final in 1948, but lost 1–2 to 1. FC Nürnberg.

Kaiserslautern became a presence on the national scene through the early 1950s, capturing their first German championship in 1951 with a 2–1 victory of their own, this time over Preußen Münster. They won a second title in 1953, followed by two losing final appearances in 1954 and 1955. The club also sent five players to the national side for the 1954 FIFA World Cup, which West Germany won in what became popularly known as "The Miracle of Bern".

Kaiserslautern's performance fell off late in the decade and into the early 1960s, the only highlight being an advance to the 1961 DFB-Pokal final, where they lost 0–2 to Werder Bremen. The side recovered its form in time to again win their division on the eve of the formation in 1963 of the Bundesliga, Germany's new professional football league. This secured them one of the 16 places in the new top flight circuit. However, the club's next honours would be some time in coming: they made failed German Cup final appearances in 1972, 1976, and 1981 and were UEFA Cup semi-finalists in 1982 (losing narrowly to eventual winners IFK Göteborg). In that time from 1974 to 1984 Ronnie Hellström as goalkeeper, among others, has shaped the time. The club could finally win the domestic Cup in 1990. They followed up the next season with their first Bundesliga championship. Both times the manager was Karl-Heinz Feldkamp.

Rise and fall from the top flight
1. FCK won a second German Cup in 1996, but that victory was soured since the team had been relegated to 2. Bundesliga with a 16th-place finish just one week before the Cup final. At the time, Kaiserslautern was one of only four of the original 16 teams that had played in each Bundesliga season since the inception of the league, having never been relegated. This group also included Eintracht Frankfurt (who went down in the same season), 1. FC Köln (down in 1998), and "the Dinosaur", Hamburger SV, whose spell ended in 2018.

The Red Devils came storming back with an accomplishment unique in Bundesliga history – and very rare across the major European football leagues – by winning promotion from the 2. Bundesliga at the first attempt in 1997, and immediately going on to win the national championship under veteran coach Otto Rehhagel. They also played in the 1998–99 UEFA Champions League, where they topped a group comprising PSV, Benfica and HJK Helsinki but were eliminated in the quarter-finals by compatriots Bayern Munich, who also took back the domestic title (FCK finished 5th).

The club, however, found itself in serious trouble soon after. Despite coming close to a UEFA Cup final in 2001, Kaiserslautern soon found itself on the brink of bankruptcy and at the centre of controversy being played out publicly. The club's management – Jürgen Friedrich, Robert Wieschemann and Gerhard Herzog – were forced out. A new team president, Rene C. Jäggi, sold the debt-ridden Fritz-Walter-Stadion to an entity owned by the Land Rheinland-Pfalz and the city of Kaiserslautern, thus saving the club from financial disaster, while a new coach, Erik Gerets, led a run after the winter break that moved the footballers out of last place and saved them from relegation.

The club started the 2003–04 season under the burden of a three-point penalty imposed by the German Football Association for its financial misdeeds. After a faltering start to the season, Gerets was fired and replaced by Kurt Jara. Jara was unpopular with the FCK faithful for his defensive football philosophy, but with him at the helm, the club had a safe season. Jara, however, quit the position before the season ended, citing irreconcilable differences with club management.

2005–present
In 2005, Michael Henke, who served as long-time assistant to Germany's most successful coach Ottmar Hitzfeld, became coach. FCK was initially successful, but then suffered a string of reverses and crashed to the bottom of the table. Henke was fired, and FCK alumnus Wolfgang Wolf took up the trainer's role. Wolf brought in many young, home-grown players, but despite winning over fans and experts alike, the 2005–06 season ended in failure as FCK was once again relegated to the 2. Bundesliga after a nine-year stay at the top flight. They finished the 2006–07 season in sixth place in the 2. Bundesliga, seven points out of the promotion places.

On 20 May 2007, the club announced the Norwegian manager Kjetil Rekdal, formerly with Belgian side Lierse, as their new head coach. Rekdal took over the reins on 1 July. Due to very bad results (the club being in 16th place in the standings with only three wins in 19 games), Rekdal was sacked and replaced by Milan Šašić in February 2008. In April 2008, the club hired Stefan Kuntz as chairman, and with new leadership at the helm, managed to save themselves from relegation to the new 3. Liga with a win over already promoted 1. FC Köln on the final day of the 2007–08 season.

Šašić lasted almost the entire 2008–09 season but was dismissed on 4 May 2009 after run of poor results in the second half of the season, and three days after a 1–5 defeat by Hansa Rostock. Alois Schwartz was named interim coach and he managed the club to a seventh-place finish on the season. The club eventually hired Marco Kurz as head coach.

Under Kurz, the club secured promotion to the 1. Bundesliga on 25 April 2010 after four years in the second league. At the start of the 2010–11 season, newly promoted 1. FCK had a promising two-straight wins, including a 2–0 victory over the previous year's Bundesliga champions, Bayern Munich. However, after a hard-fought 2–1 defeat at Mainz 05 and a 5–0 drubbing at eventual season champions, Borussia Dortmund, the club began to struggle and fell back to just ahead of the relegation zone. The club then had a poor start to the second half of the season – dropping into the relegation zone for several weeks – but managed to coalesce and eventually earned seven victories in their last ten matches, recording only two defeats and a single draw. They ended this run with four straight victories to finish the season at the seventh place.

The following season, 2011–12, the club finished in the bottom 18th place and after only two seasons in the top flight, were relegated to the 2. Bundesliga. They remained in that division until 2018, being relegated to the third tier for the first time in club history.

In March 2022, a U.S. consortium consisting of Paul Conway, Chien Lee, Michael Kalt, Krishen Sud and Randy Frankel bought 10% of the club.

On 24 May 2022, four years after their first-ever relegation into Germany's third division, Kaiserslautern were promoted back to the 2. Bundesliga.

Reserve team

The club's reserve team, 1. FC Kaiserslautern II, played as 1. FC Kaiserslautern Amateure until 2005. It made a first appearance in the tier three Amateurliga Südwest in 1957. It won a league championship in 1960 and 1968 but was not entitled to promotion to professional level. In 1978, when the Oberliga Südwest was introduced the team qualified for this new league which it would belong to, with the exception of the 1982–83 season, until 1992. It won promotion back to the Oberliga in 1994 and became a yo-yo team between this league and the Regionalliga above, a league newly introduced in 1994. The team was relegated from the latter in 1996, 2000, 2004 and 2007 but each time won promotion back to the league. Between 2012 and 2017, the club played in the Regionalliga Südwest.

The team has also won the Southwestern Cup on three occasions, in 1979, 1997 and 2008. Through this competition, 1. FC Kaiserslautern II qualified for the DFB-Pokal on three occasions, reaching the second round twice and being drawn against their own first team in 1997–98 where they lost 5–0.

Kits

Recent seasons

Key
P = Played; W = Win; D = Draw; L = Loss; F = Goals for; A = Goals against; GD = Goal difference; Pts = Points; Cup = DFB-Pokal; CWC = European Cup Winners' Cup; EL = UEFA Europa League; CL = UEFA Champions League.
 – = Not attended; 1R = 1st round; 2R = 2nd round; 3R = 3rd round; 1/8 = Round of sixteen; QF = Quarter-finals; SF = Semi-finals.

Honours

League
German football championship
Winners: 1951, 1953, 1990–91, 1997–98
Runners-up:  1948, 1954, 1955, 1993–94

2. Bundesliga
Winners: 1996–97, 2009–10

Cup
DFB-Pokal
Winners: 1989–90, 1995–96
Runners-up: 1960–61, 1971–72, 1975–76, 1980–81, 2002–03

DFB-Supercup
Winners: 1991

Regional
Oberliga Südwest
Winners (11): 1946–47, 1947–48, 1948–49, 1949–50, 1950–51, 1952–53, 1953–54, 1954–55, 1955–56, 1956–57, 1962–63
Runners-up: 1945–46, 1957–58
Gauliga Westmark
Winners: 1941–42
Westkreis-Liga
Winners: 1908–09
Runners-up: 1909–10, 1911–12
Southwestern Cup
Winners: 2018–19, 2019–20

Youth
German under-19 championship
Winners: 1991–92
Runners-up: 1983–84, 1990–91, 1992–93, 2010–11

German under-17 championship
Winners: 1982–83
Runners-up: 1991–92

Stadium

FCK plays its home fixtures in the Fritz Walter Stadion first built in 1920. In 1985 the stadium and the adjacent street were named for the player who brought the club to prominence after World War II. The facility is built on the Betzenberg, literally "Mount Betze", a steep sandstone hill.

The stadium has a capacity of 49,850 and was a 2006 World Cup venue, hosting four preliminary round and one group of 16-round matches. The facility underwent a major refurbishment for the tournament with addition of new grandstands and a roof.

Club culture

Kaiserslautern's Fritz-Walter-Stadion has long been a feared away venue given the rabid ferocity of Kaiserslautern fans: the most faithful of these supporters are located in the stadium's "Westkurve" (Westside, literally "West Curve", since the stands used to be shaped in a semicircle behind the goals). Most famously, Bayern Munich once lost a match here in a charged atmosphere by a score of 7–4 after leading 4–1 at the 58th minute.

The club has friendly ties to 1860 Munich, VfB Stuttgart, Werder Bremen and Kilmarnock F.C. of Scotland and are bitter rivals of Waldhof Mannheim and Bayern Munich. They also have lesser local rivalries with Eintracht Frankfurt and, more recently, with Mainz 05 and Karlsruher SC.

Players

Current squad

Out on loan

Former players

Coaching staff

 

|}

Other sports
1. FC Kaiserslautern also has sports departments in athletics, basketball, boxing, handball, headis, hockey, running, and triathlon.

Basketball
The basketball department was founded in 1952. The seniors team played in the second German Basketball league from 2002 until 2007. In the 2014–15 season, both the male and female senior teams play in the fourth division.

Boxing
The boxing department exists since the times of FV Kaiserslautern. Most prominent athletes are Silver medalist of the 1964 Summer Olympics Emil Schulz, Bronze medalist of the 1988 Summer Olympics Reiner Gies and, before his professional career, later European heavyweight champion Karl Mildenberger.

Former departments

Wheelchair basketball
The wheelchair basketball team FCK Rolling Devils was founded in 2009 as a part of the club's basketball department and turned into a separate department in 2013. Since 2014, the Rolling Devils play in the 1st German Wheelchair Basketball Federal League. In July 2015, the outsourcing of Rolling Devils into an independent club with 1.FC Kaiserslautern as name sponsor took place and the FCK department was suspended at the annual meeting of 1.FC Kaiserslautern in December 2015.

References

External links

Kaiserslautern statistics

 
Football clubs in Germany
Football clubs in Rhineland-Palatinate
Association football clubs established in 1900
1900 establishments in Germany
Kaiserslautern
Bundesliga clubs
2. Bundesliga clubs
3. Liga clubs